Ivo Passeira Nicolau (born 21 March 1983), simply known as Ivo Nicolau is a Portuguese professional footballer playing for  Esperança Lagos as a defender.

Club career
Born in Portimão, he a long youth career with local Portimonense between 1996 and 2002. He was transferred to Marco in order to seek more first team opportunities. After a second disappointing stint, he stepped a division lower with Tourizense. In 2012, he returned to his boyhood club Portimonense in Segunda Liga.

References

External links
 

1983 births
Living people
Association football defenders
Portuguese footballers
People from Portimão
Louletano D.C. players
Portimonense S.C. players
Liga Portugal 2 players
Segunda Divisão players
S.C. Olhanense players
Sportspeople from Faro District